The Muskegon Mohawks were a minor league professional ice hockey team in the International Hockey League from 1965 to 1984. Muskegon were Turner Cup champions in 1968.

This team was originally named the Muskegon Zephyrs. After the completion of the 1983–84 season, the team was again renamed, this time becoming the Muskegon Lumberjacks.

Season-by-season results

† indicates replaced mid-season
‡ indicates replacement

References
Muskegon Mohawks Statistics

International Hockey League (1945–2001) teams
Defunct ice hockey teams in the United States
Professional ice hockey teams in Michigan
Ice hockey clubs established in 1965
Sports clubs disestablished in 1984
Montreal Canadiens minor league affiliates
New York Islanders minor league affiliates
Atlanta Flames minor league affiliates
Calgary Flames minor league affiliates
Colorado Rockies (NHL) minor league affiliates
Pittsburgh Penguins minor league affiliates
New Jersey Devils minor league affiliates
Toronto Maple Leafs minor league affiliates
1965 establishments in Michigan
1984 disestablishments in Michigan
Sports in Muskegon, Michigan